The Fife & Forfar Yeomanry/Scottish Horse is unit of the British Army regiment formed in 1956. Originally a regiment in its own right, it is currently a Yeomanry Squadron of the Scottish and North Irish Yeomanry.

History

The regiment was formed by the amalgamation of the Fife and Forfar Yeomanry and the Scottish Horse on 1 November 1956. In 1967 the regiment was put into suspended animation (and not allowed to recruit).

In 1969 the squadron was reduced to a cadre strength and became sponsored by 153 (Highland) Transport Regiment. The cadre was disbanded in 1975. However, the lineage was revived when C (Fife and Forfar Yeomanry/Scottish Horse) Squadron, The Scottish Yeomanry was formed with a reconnaissance role in 1992. The squadron transferred to the Queen's Own Yeomanry in 1999.

The unit's guidon was paraded at a ceremony to mark the receipt of the Queen's Own Yeomanry's first guidon from The Prince of Wales in 2007. The squadron transferred from the Queen's Own Yeomanry to the Scottish and North Irish Yeomanry in 2013.

The squadron operates in a light cavalry role and is primarily equipped with the Land Rover RWMIK reconnaissance vehicle.

Decorations and awards
The squadron inherited one Victoria Cross winner from its predecessor regiments: Lieutenant Colonel William English, who was awarded the Victoria Cross for his actions in 1901 in South Africa whilst serving as a lieutenant in the Scottish Horse.

Notable members of the regiment
Notable members of the regiment include Robert AG Douglas-Miller, the one-time owner of Jenners department store in Edinburgh.

Honorary Colonels and Commanding Officers
Honorary colonels and commanding officers have been as follows:

Battle honours
Fife and Forfar Yeomanry/Scottish Horse holds the combined battle honours of The Fife and Forfar Yeomanry, and Scottish Horse. This table shows the squadron's battle honours and which regiment they originate from:

Uniform
The cap badge of the Fife and Forfar Yeomanry/Scottish Horse is a mounted knight (The Thane of Fife) with a Cross of St Andrews behind. The cross contains both laurel and juniper leaves. The officers and men of the regiment wear the Duke of Atholl's Tartan, Murray of Atholl, in various forms of dress.

Alliances
Alliances are as follows:
 - Atholl Highlanders
 - The 1st/15th Royal New South Wales Lancers
 - Transvaal Scottish Regiment

See also
 :Category:Fife and Forfar Yeomanry/Scottish Horse officers

 No. 679 (The Duke of Connaught's) Squadron AAC

References

External links 
Official Website

Fife and Forfar Yeomanry
Military units and formations in Fife
Military units and formations in Angus, Scotland
Military units and formations established in 1956
Scottish regiments
Yeomanry regiments of the British Army
1956 establishments in the United Kingdom